No sé si cortarme las venas o dejármelas largas (literally, "I Don't Know Whether to Cut My Veins or Leave Them Long") is a 2013 Mexican film directed by Manolo Caro. Starring Raúl Méndez, Ludwika Paleta, Luis Ernesto Franco, Luis Gerardo Méndez, and Zuria Vega, in the lead roles.

Plot 
The film begins with the thunderous sound of two shots, one for a possible homicide and the other by suicide. First, because Nora (Ludwika Paleta) points a gun at her husband Aarón (Raúl Méndez), whom he calls his infidelity, and the second because Félix (Luis Ernesto Franco) falls into depression because they lack the support of his girlfriend and not play football. From this point the story goes back eight months before.

Cast

References

External links 

Mexican comedy films
2010s Mexican films